Raja Permaisuri Tuanku Bainun (Jawi: راج ڤرمايسوري توانکو بعينون; née Bainun binti Mohd Ali; born 7 November 1932) is the former Raja Permaisuri (Queen consort) of Malaysian state of Perak. She was also the ninth Raja Permaisuri Agong (Queen consort) of Malaysia, the first commoner to be installed as Queen consort. She is the widow of Sultan Azlan Shah and the mother of the incumbent Sultan Nazrin Shah. She is now styled as Yang Maha Mulia Raja Permaisuri Tuanku Bainun.

Background 
Tuanku Bainun was born on 7 November 1932 in Penang, the Straits Settlements and received her early education at the St. George's Girls School, Penang. She was selected to further her studies at the prestigious Teacher's Training College, Kirkby, England from 1952 to 1954.

A year after returning from England, she married Sultan Azlan Muhibbuddin Shah ibni Almarhum Sultan Yussuff Izzuddin Shah Ghafarullahu-lah of Perak on 9 December 1955. The Sultan was then a Magistrate in Kuala Lumpur, while Tuanku Bainun was teaching at her former school. She was a teacher for 22 years and has taught in various schools in Kuala Lumpur, Seremban, Raub, Taiping and Kuantan.

Queen consort 
Upon her husband's accession to the Perak throne on 3 February 1984, she became Raja Permaisuri of Perak with the title of Tuanku. In Perak, Queens of royal blood are known as Raja Perempuan, while the title of Raja Permaisuri was reserved for commoner consorts. Her Royal Highness was officially proclaimed the Raja Permaisuri Perak Darul Ridzuan on 9 December 1985 in a historic ceremony at Istana Iskandariah in Kuala Kangsar.

Sultan Azlan Shah was selected as the ninth Yang di-Pertuan Agong and during the Oath Taking and Signing Ceremony on 26 April 1989, Tuanku Bainun was proclaimed Raja Permaisuri Agong. Tuanku Bainun is the first commoner ever to become Queen of Malaysia. She was crowned Raja Permaisuri Agong on 19 February 1988 a new throne made of silver that replaced the ancient wooden throne used by Malaysia's eight previous Queens of royal blood, adding another first to her crown. They held these titles until the end of Azlan Shah's term on 25 April 1994.

She ceased to be Raja Permaisuri of Perak on 28 May 2014, after her husband died. She was succeeded a month later by her daughter in-law, Tuanku Zara Salim.

Royal family 
The royal couple had five children, two princes and three princesses. The eldest is Sultan Nazrin Muizzuddin Shah ibni Almarhum Sultan Azlan Muhibbuddin Shah, the current Sultan of Perak. The others are Raja Dato’ Seri Azureen Binti Almarhum Sultan Azlan Muhibbuddin Shah, Raja Dato’ Seri Ashman Shah Ibni Sultan Azlan Muhibbuddin Shah, Raja Dato' Seri Eleena Binti Almarhum Sultan Azlan Muhibbuddin Shah and Raja Dato' Seri Yong Sofia Binti Almarhum Sultan Azlan Muhibbuddin Shah.

Awards and recognitions 
She was awarded:

Honours of Perak 
  : 
  Recipient of the Royal Family Order of Perak (DK)
  Member First Class of the Azlanii Royal Family Order (DKA I, 2010)

Honours of Malaysia 
  : 
  Recipient of the Order of the Crown of the Realm (DMN)
  : 
  First Class of the Royal Family Order of Selangor (DK I, 11 December 2005)

Foreign Honours 
  : 
 Grand Cordon of the Order of the Precious Crown (30 September 1991)
  : 
 Grand Cross of the Order of Chula Chom Klao (September 1990)

Academic 
 Fellow of Liverpool John Moores University

Places named after her 
Several places were named after her, including: 
 Raja Pemaisuri Bainun Bridge in Lumut, Perak
 Raja Permaisuri Bainun Hospital in Ipoh, Perak
 Raja Permaisuri Bainun Mosque in Kuala Kangsar, Perak
 Jalan Raja Permaisuri Bainun in Ipoh, Perak
 Institut Pendidikan Guru Kampus Tuanku Bainun in Bukit Mertajam, Penang
 SMK Raja Permaisuri Bainun, a secondary school in Ipoh, Perak
 Tuanku Bainun Library in Universiti Pendidikan Sultan Idris, Tanjung Malim, Perak

See also 
 Yang Di-Pertuan Agong
 Raja Permaisuri Agong

References

|-

1932 births
People from Penang
Living people
Royal House of Perak
First Classes of Royal Family Order of Selangor
Perak royal consorts
Malaysian royal consorts
Malaysian people of Malay descent
Malaysian Muslims

Grand Cordons of the Order of the Precious Crown
Dames Grand Cross of the Order of Chula Chom Klao
Malaysian queens consort
Recipients of the Order of the Crown of the Realm